The 2017 MIAA Division 1A Boy's Ice Hockey Tournament was the state championship tournament for boy's ice hockey in Massachusetts, held from February 26 to March 18. The tournament involved 10 teams in play to determine the state champion of the Massachusetts Interscholastic Athletic Association (MIAA).

BC High defeated Pope Francis 2–1 to win the program's 5th MIAA Division 1A title.

Qualifying teams 
The Catholic Conference, Merrimack Valley Conference, and Middlesex League each had 3 teams receive a berth in the tournament, while the Catholic Central League had one tea receive a berth. Three independent programs also received a berth.

Bracket 

Note: * denotes overtime period

Results

Record by conference

References 

MIAA Division 1A Boy's Ice Hockey Tournament
MIAA Division 1A Boy's Ice Hockey Tournament
MIAA Division 1A Boy's Ice Hockey Tournament
MIAA Division 1A Boy's Ice Hockey Tournament
Ice hockey competitions in Massachusetts
Massachusetts Interscholastic Athletic Association
Ice hockey competitions in Boston
Sports competitions in Lowell, Massachusetts
Billerica, Massachusetts